Henrike Tehrani (born Henrike Kadzidroga; 31 May 1971) is a German former professional tennis player.

Born in Bad Kissingen, Kadzidroga competed on the professional tour from 1988 to 1992. She reached a best singles ranking of 230 in the world and qualified for four WTA Tour singles main draws, including Paris twice.

Kadzidroga is now a general practitioner in the town of Hennef.

ITF finals

Singles (0–1)

Doubles (2–5)

References

External links
 
 

1971 births
Living people
West German female tennis players
German female tennis players
German general practitioners
People from Bad Kissingen
Sportspeople from Lower Franconia
Tennis people from Bavaria